Matti Lähitie (born 13 February 1985) is a Finnish former professional footballer. He played as a defender or defensive midfielder.

Playing career 
Lähitie started his football career at Finnish club FC Jazz, where he made his league debut at the age of just seventeen years old. In total he made forty appearances at FC Jazz between 2002 and 2004, scoring twice.

In 2005, he signed with FC Lahti who were playing in Veikkausliiga at the time. Lähitie saw this as a step-up in his career, with Finland internationals such as Jari Litmanen, Pekka Lagerblom and Mika Väyrynen also playing for Lahti.

In 2006 Lähitie moved to his third Finnish club, JJK playing in the Ykkönen.

External links 
FC JJK official website 
Guardian Football
Veikkausliiga Hall of Fame

1985 births
Living people
Finnish footballers
Association football midfielders
FC Lahti players
Seinäjoen Jalkapallokerho players
JJK Jyväskylä players
Veikkausliiga players
Sportspeople from Pori